Bohdan Serhiyovych Lyednyev (born 7 April 1998) is a Ukrainian professional footballer who plays as a midfielder for Dynamo Kyiv.

Career
A native of Skvyra, Kyiv Oblast, Lyednyev is a product of the FC Dynamo Kyiv and FC Dnipro academies.

He played in the Ukrainian Youth Football League from 2011 to 2015 for Atlet Kyiv and FC Dnipro. In 2015 he took part in the Dnipropetrovsk Oblast championship for FC Dnipro amateur squad. In 2015 and 2016, he played in the Ukrainian Premier League Reserves for the under-19 and under-21 teams of FC Dnipro and Dynamo Kyiv, respectively.

Lyednyev also played for the Dynamo senior team in the 2017–18 Ukrainian Cup against FC Oleksandriya.

Lyednyev's loan to Hungarian club Fehérvár was terminated on 16 January 2023.

Career statistics

Honours
Dynamo Kyiv
Ukrainian Premier League: 2020–21
Ukrainian Cup: 2020–21

References

External links
 
 
 

1998 births
People from Skvyra
Sportspeople from Kyiv Oblast
Living people
Ukrainian footballers
Ukraine youth international footballers
Ukraine under-21 international footballers
Association football midfielders
FC Dnipro players
FC Dynamo Kyiv players
FC Zorya Luhansk players
Fehérvár FC players
Ukrainian Premier League players
Nemzeti Bajnokság I players
Ukrainian expatriate footballers
Expatriate footballers in Hungary
Ukrainian expatriate sportspeople in Hungary